John Stoneham (15 June 1892 – 1950) was an English professional footballer who played as a goalkeeper for Sunderland.

References

1892 births
1950 deaths
People from Witham
English footballers
Association football goalkeepers
Carlisle United F.C. players
Sunderland A.F.C. players
Nelson F.C. players
English Football League players